Trimeresurus mcgregori, commonly known as McGregor's pit viper or the Batanes pit viper, is a species of venomous snake in the subfamily Crotalinae of the family Viperidae. The species is endemic to the Philippines.

Etymology
The specific name, mcgregori, is in honor of Australian-American ornithologist Richard Crittenden McGregor (1871–1936), who collected the type specimen, and survived its bite.

Description
The scalation of T. mcgregori includes 21 (23) rows of dorsal scales at midbody, 170-172/173-178 (or 169-172/168-178) ventral scales in males/females, 62-66/58-60 (or 63-69/56-62) subcaudal scales in males/females, and 10-11 supralabial scales.

Geographic range
T. mcgregori is found in the Philippines on the Batanes Islands. The type locality given is "Batan Island, Batanes Group, (lying between Luzon and Formosa)" (Philippine Islands).

Habitat

Taxonomy
T. mcgregori was originally described as a new species by E.H. Taylor in 1919. It was considered to be a subspecies of T. flavomaculatus by Alan E. Leviton (1961). It was re-elevated to a full species by Andreas Gumprecht (2001, 2002).

References

Further reading
Gumprecht A (2002). "Die Bambusottern der Gattung Trimeresurus Lacépède Tiel V: Die philippinischen Bambusottern des Trimeresurus flavomaculatus-Komplexes II. Die Batanes-Bambusotter Trimeresurus mcgregori Taylor, 1919 ". Sauria 24 (3): 31–44. (in German).
Sweeney, Roger (1994). "McGregor's pit viper, Trimeresurus flavomaculatus mcgregori ". Herptile: Journal of the International Herpetological Society 19 (2): 86–88.
Taylor EH (1919). "New or rare Philippine reptiles". Philippine Journal of Science 14: 105–125. (Trimeresurus mcgregori, new species, pp. 110–112.)
Weinell JL, Hooper E, Leviton AE, Brown RM (2019). "Illustrated Key to the Snakes of the Philippines". Proceedings of the California Academy of Sciences, Fourth Series 66 (1): 1–49.

External links
 

mcgregori
Reptiles of the Philippines
Fauna of Batanes